Agirish is an urban-type settlement in Sovetsky District of Khanty-Mansi Autonomous Okrug, Russia. Population:

References

Notes

Sources

Urban-type settlements in Khanty-Mansi Autonomous Okrug